The Butterfly Has Come to This World (TC: 蝴蝶來過這世界) is a Mandopop album by Edmond Leung, his first album in Mandarin.

Track listing
The Butterfly Has Come to This World (蝴蝶來過這世界)
I Can't forget (我就是忘不掉)
Three Minutes (三分鐘)
I don't ask (我不問)
Don't kiss me (不要吻我)
Lonely Catcher (寂寞捕手)
The Map Vanishes (消失的地圖)
Fireworks Hostel (煙火旅館)
Look for Happy Man (找快樂的人)
You Fall in Love with Guitarist (你愛上吉他手)

External links
The Butterfly Has Come To This World, Yesasia.com

Edmond Leung albums
2000 albums
Mandarin-language albums